The third season of American talent show competition series America's Got Talent was broadcast on NBC from June 17 to October 1, 2008. After the conclusion of the second season, changes to the program included the creation of additional audition episodes in the broadcast schedule, the involvement of quarter-finals in the competition, and doubling the number of participants that advanced from the boot camp stage. Between August 7–26, the show had a planned break to avoid clashing with the network's live coverage of the 2008 Summer Olympics.

The third season was won by opera singer Neal E. Boyd, with singer and pianist Eli Mattson finishing in second place, and violinists Nuttin' But Stringz placing third. During its broadcast, the season averaged roughly over 10.75 million viewers.

Season overview 
Following the previous season, auditions took place in five major cities: New York, Chicago, Los Angeles, Dallas, and Atlanta. Additional rounds of auditions were made online via Myspace and Facebook. Changes to the schedule of live episodes were due to the 2008 Summer Olympics, since the event received live coverage on NBC. The program was on hiatus between August 7–26, in order to avoid it clashing with the network's schedule of the sporting event.

The third season had a number of additional changes put into place with the program's format, following the second season, two of which brought it along a similar arrangement used for Britain's Got Talent. Editing of filmed auditions for their respective episodes were conducted in a similar manner to the British edition, with footage in each episode consisting of a montage chosen from each major city whose venue featured audition sessions. For example, a collection of auditions (both minor and notable from Dallas), preceded those from another major city following a commercial break. Participants in live rounds were determined by two separate votes, while the public decided the first four to advance, and the judges chose the fifth participant to join them (from those who placed 5th and 6th respectively in the public vote). The remaining changes included an expanded number of participants for the "Las Vegas Callback" stage of auditions, along with cosmetic updates to the program. Alongside a new title card, the judges' table and the red "Xs" were re-styled to match the design of those used in Britain's Got Talent.

Results episodes for this season were arranged on a sporadic schedule alongside live episodes, rather than a pre-ordained arrangement after the last two seasons. Quarter-finals had their results announced on the same day. Semi-finals and the knockout final among the top ten were done the day after the performance episode had been broadcast. The grand-finale's results were aired a week after the performance episode.

Forty of the participants who auditioned for this season secured a place in the live quarter-finals, with ten quarterfinalists performing in each show. About twenty from these rounds advanced and were split between the two semi-finals, with around ten semi-finalists securing a place in the final, and five finalists securing a place in the season's grand-finale. These are the results of each participant's overall performance during the season:

 |  |  | 
  | 

  This act was originally eliminated during the bootcamp stage, but was advanced into the contest, via a public vote, after another act was forced to step down for medical reasons.

Quarter-final summary 
 Buzzed Out |  Judges' choice | 
 |

Quarter-final 1 (August 26) 

  Because of the majority vote for The James Gang, Hasselhoff's voting intention was not disclosed as a result.

Quarter-final 2 (August 27)

Quarter-final 3 (September 2)

Quarter-final 4 (September 3)

Semi-final summary 
 Buzzed Out |  Judges' choice | 
 |

Semi-final 1 (September 9)

Semi-final 2 (September 10) 
 Guest performer: Terry Fator

Finals summary
 |  | 
 |  |  Buzzed Out (Top 10 Finals only)

Final - Top 10 (September 17) 
 Guest Performer, Results Show: Natasha Bedingfield

Grand-finale (September 24)

Ratings

References 

2008 American television seasons
America's Got Talent seasons